Jacob Schaefer Jr. (born October 18, 1894 in Chicago, Illinois, U.S., died  November 10, 1975 in Cleveland, Ohio, U.S.) was a professional carom billiards player with German grandparentage, a specialist in balkline games, and was inducted into the Billiard Congress of America Hall of Fame in 1968. His nickname was "The Prodigy".

Professional career

Schaefer is widely considered by historians of the sport to have been America's all-time greatest balkline player.

Titles and tournament wins
 World 18.1 Balkline Champion (1921, 1923-1927, 1929, 1930) 
 World 18.2 Balkline Champion (1927, 1928)
 World 28.2 Balkline Champion (1937, 1938)

Records
In 18.2 balkline, Schaefer held four records never broken by another American (some have since been beaten by non-Americans):
A 400-point game average (from the )

400-0.	The 1925 World Championship 18.2 Balkline Tournament was held in the Congress Hotel, Chicago.  The sixth game of the tournament on Thursday evening, February 26, featured Jake Schaefer II against Erich Hagenlocher of Germany.  Schaefer won the lag and shot first.  He made 400 consecutive billiards and won the game.  Hagenlocher was quoted later as saying that toward the end of the run he was hoping that Schaefer wouldn't miss.  Hagenlocher was afraid that after sitting and watching for more than an hour, he wouldn't be able to stand up and hit the end rail.

A 57.14 tournament grand average
A 93.25 match grand average
A high run of 432 in a match

Personal life

He was the son of fellow billiards pro Jacob Schaefer Sr. (1855–1910), who was known as "the Wizard" by reason of his exploits with the cue.

Both Jacob Jr. and Hoppe were tutored by the elder Schaefer, whose last match before his death was a successful defense of his title against Hoppe.

Jacob Schaefer III (b. 1938) and Jacob Schaefer IV (b. 1970) are both academics in science.  Jacob Schaefer V (b. 2007) has not yet made a career decision.

References

American carom billiards players
1894 births
1975 deaths
American people of German descent
World champions in carom billiards